Mouth Silence is the second mashup album by American musician and comedian Neil Cicierega. Following the format of his previous release, Mouth Sounds, the album is composed of mashups and remixes of popular songs from the 1980s, 1990's, and 2000's. 

Unlike Mouth Sounds, which used the song "All Star" by Smash Mouth as a recurring element, no tracks on Mouth Silence explicitly reference Smash Mouth. 

A third installment, Mouth Moods, was released in 2017, and a fourth installment, Mouth Dreams, in 2020.

Although Mouth Silence is the second album released in the series, according to Cicierega, it is a prequel to Mouth Sounds. It is, jokingly, also considered a "Squeakuel" to Mouth Moods, and a "Shriekquel" to Mouth Dreams.

Reception
Much like its predecessor, Mouth Sounds, critics remarked on the album's simultaneous appeal to and perversion of the listener's nostalgia, with Katie Rife of The A.V. Club describing it as "laugh out loud horrifying" and Ryan Manning of The Verge promising that listeners would "have a strong reaction, negative, positive, horrified, glorified". Sasha Geffen, writing for Impose Magazine, describes the effect as "total context collapse", calling it "paradoxically [...] comforting". As of July 8, 2021, the album has received over 843,000 plays on SoundCloud.

Track listing

In addition, multiple tracks are embedded with clips from Smash Mouth's "All Star" that are slowed down by a factor of 1728%.  The song lyrics are sung in the octave below Middle C, making those notes lower than the range of human hearing.  To hear the clips in their original key, the music must be sped up by factor of 1728%.

Like in Mouth Dreams, there is a hidden message in the track info for Mouth Silence. Each track contains a one-character comment; when the tracks are arranged alphabetically by title, the comments spell out "SO MUCH 2 DO SO MUCH 2 SEE," a line from the first verse of Smash Mouth's "All Star."

Several tracks feature original instrumental work by Cicierega, and the instrumental of "Space Monkey Mafia" is entirely original.

Notes

References

External links

Mouth Silence on Internet Archive

2014 mixtape albums
Mashup albums
2014 remix albums
Neil Cicierega remix albums
Plunderphonics albums